Perit is an underworld deity in Egyptian mythology. She is one of the twelve goddesses in the ninth sector of Duat.

She utters words that give life and strength to Osiris.

References 

Egyptian goddesses